Tei Saito (8 February 1907 – 23 January 1991) was a Japanese politician. She was one of the first group of women elected to the House of Representatives in 1946.

Biography
Saito was born in Wakayama Prefecture in 1907 and was educated at Uchimi Girls' Vocational School. She married Motohide Saito, a lawyer.

After the war, Saito became a member of the Japan Progressive Party and served as deputy director of its women's section. She was a candidate for the party in Wakayama in the 1946 general elections (the first in which women could vote), and was elected to the House of Representatives. She later moved to Tokyo with her husband and died in 1991.

References

1907 births
20th-century Japanese women politicians
20th-century Japanese politicians
Members of the House of Representatives (Japan)
Japan Progressive Party politicians
Democratic Party (Japan, 1947) politicians
1991 deaths